The Chuukese, previously spelled Trukese, are an Micronesian-speaking ethnic group indigenous to the island of Chuuk and its surrounding islands and atolls. They constitute almost 49% of the population of the Federated States of Micronesia, making them by far the largest ethnic group in the country.

Language
Their language is Chuukese, which belongs to the Chuukic branch of Micronesian languages, which is in turn part of the Malayo-Polynesian language family. The Malayo-Polynesian language family is a subdivision of a wider Austronesian language family, one of the world's primary language families. The language is written in a modified Latin alphabet.

Population
A 2010 census showed that the Chuukese people were the fastest growing group of Pacific Islanders during the 2000s decade in the United States, increasing from a population of about 700 in the year 2000 to more than 4,000 in time for the 2010 census.

Culture

Religion 
Although the Chuukese are overwhelmingly Christian, traditional beliefs in spirit possession by the dead still exist. Allegedly, these spirits overwhelmingly possess women, and spirit possession is usually brought on by family conflicts. The spirits, speaking through the women, typically admonish family members to treat each other better.

Traditional marriage practices
Traditionally, before a man could consider marriage, he needed to have experience in farming, fishing, and boat construction. He also had to be able to build his own house. When he had these skills he would inform his parents that he was ready for marriage; the parents would then search for a suitable young woman to be his wife. When they had decided on a girl, the parents of the man would visit the girl's parents. They would introduce themselves and the purpose of their visit, and discuss possible marriage with the girl's parents. If a marriage was agreed upon, the young man would stay with the girl's parents and the girl would reside with the young man's parents, up until the wedding day. Prior to the marriage, both families would prepare a feast which would be attended by the leaders of their respective families. According to custom, the girl's family would provide enough food for the man's family, and his family would do the same for the girl's.

There are some attitudes towards marriage among the Chuukese people that may have been retained from past tradition. While both the man and woman will desire compatible sex partners in marriage, they look even more for good workers. A person incapable of work is unlikely to be successful at marriage in Chuuk. A person is well aware of the character and abilities of those in the community, and selects a partner accordingly.

The Legend of Wonip
According to legend, five brothers once resided on the island of Faichuuk in the Chuuk lagoon. One day, their father called all the boys to him, and told them about a lost island near Faichuuk. He said that someday they should search for it. Later, after the father died, the brothers decided to look for the island, and searched for three days, but could not find it. The brothers felt that the father's story was not true; all with the exception of the youngest brother.

The youngest son believed the father, and set sail by himself in search of the island. After travelling a short distance, he saw a huge white shark that was leading the canoe to the area of the lost island. The boy knew that the shark must be his dead father's ghost. The shark disappeared once the canoe had neared the island.

The youngest son lowered his sails and dropped anchor. He then dived deep below the surface of the sea and found the lost island. When he returned to the surface, he boarded his canoe but found that his anchor was stuck and he could not lift it. So finally, he cut the anchor rope and sailed back to his home on Faichuuk.

When he returned, he told the other brothers what had happened, and early next morning they sailed off to find the island. When they arrived at the island, the oldest brother swam down and tied a rope to the island. After returning to the boat, he pulled on the rope as hard as he could, but could not raise the island from the bottom. The second brother tried, and then the third and the fourth, but the result was the same – the island could not be raised from the ocean floor.

Finally, the youngest brother tugged on the rope and amazingly the island came up to the surface. At that very moment, a black bird flew overhead and called out to the brothers that the island should be called Wonip, and must remain forever the property of the youngest son who had believed his father.

About a mile north of Faichuuk sits a small island all by itself. There, the descendants of the youngest brother still live. The island is still called Wonip, the name of the brothers' clan.

Livelihood and housing 
The traditional subsistence of the Chuukese is fishing. In modern times, fishing is still an important source of income for families and both men and women engage in the occupation. Traditional Chuukese homes were built using palm thatch where families maintained strong intimate bonds.

References 

Ethnic groups in the Federated States of Micronesia
Indigenous peoples of Micronesia
Chuuk State